The following television stations broadcast on digital channel 47 in the United States:

 K47HT in Roseburg, Oregon, to move to channel 14
 K47JC-D in Wadena, Minnesota, to move to channel 22, on virtual channel 47
 K47JE-D in Olivia, Minnesota, to move to channel 15, on virtual channel 47
 K47JK-D in Pocatello, Idaho, to move to channel 20
 K47LM-D in Prineville, etc., Oregon
 KWCC-LD in Wenatchee, Washington, to move to channel 25
 KWWO-LD in Walla Walla, Washington, to move to channel 32

The following stations, which are no longer licensed, formerly broadcast on digital channel 47:
 K47BP-D in Follett, Texas
 K47GM-D in New Mobeetie, Texas
 KKNF-LD in Lufkin, Texas
 KLPN-LD in Longview, Texas
 W47DM-D in Cullowhee, North Carolina
 W47DX-D in Canovanas, Puerto Rico
 WEKK-LD in Wausau, Wisconsin

References

47 digital TV stations in the United States